In the angelology of different religions, a hierarchy of angels is a ranking system of angels. Higher ranks have more power or authority over lower ranks, and different ranks have differences in appearance, such as varying numbers of wings or faces.

Abrahamic religions

Judaism

The Jewish angelic hierarchy is established in the Hebrew Bible, Talmud, Rabbinic literature, and traditional Jewish liturgy. They are categorized in different hierarchies proposed by various theologians. For example, Maimonides, in his Mishneh Torah or Yad ha-Chazakah: Yesodei ha-Torah, counts ten ranks of angels.

Christianity

The most influential Catholic angelic hierarchy was that put forward by Pseudo-Dionysius the Areopagite in the 5th or 6th century in his book De Coelesti Hierarchia (On the Celestial Hierarchy). Dionysius described nine levels of spiritual beings which he grouped into three orders:

Highest orders
Seraphim
Cherubim
Thrones
Middle orders
Dominions
Virtues
Powers
Lowest orders
Principalities
Archangels
Angels

During the Middle Ages, various schemes were proposed, some drawing on and expanding on Pseudo-Dionysius, others suggesting completely different classifications.

Pseudo-Dionysius (On the Celestial Hierarchy) and Thomas Aquinas (Summa Theologiae) drew on passages from the New Testament, specifically Ephesians  and Colossians 1:16, to develop a schema of three Hierarchies, Spheres or Triads of angels, with each Hierarchy containing three Orders or Choirs.

Islam

There is no standard hierarchical organization in Islam that parallels the Christian division into different "choirs" or spheres, and the topic is not directly addressed in the Quran. However, it is clear that there is a set order or hierarchy that exists between angels, defined by the assigned jobs and various tasks to which angels are commanded by God. Some scholars suggest that Islamic angels can be grouped into fourteen categories, with some of the higher orders being considered archangels. Qazwini describes an angelic hierarchy in his Aja'ib al-makhluqat with Ruh on the head of all angels, surrounded by the four archangelic cherubim. Below them are the seven angels of the seven heavens.

Fakhr al-Din al-Razi (d. 1209) divided the angels into eight groups, which shows some resemblance to Christian angelology:
 Muqarrabun (Cherubim), who surround the throne of God, constantly praising God (tasbīḥ)
 Archangels, such as Jibrāʾīl, Mīkhā'īl, Isrāfīl, and 'Azrā'īl
 Angels of Heaven, such as Riḍwan.
 Angels of Hell, Mālik and Zabānīya
 Guardian angels, who are assigned to individuals to protect them
 The angels who record the actions of people
 Angels entrusted with the affairs of the world, like the angel of thunder.

Zoroastrian

Role-playing games
Angels are occasionally presented in role-playing games as having ordered hierarchies, within which higher level angels have more power and the ability to cast more spells or exercise other magical abilities. For example, Angels in Dungeons & Dragons, a subgroup of the beings called Celestials, come in three different types, the progressively more powerful Astral Deva, Planetar, and Solar. Another game which has summonable angels is Shin Megami Tensei, often classified under Divine, or Heralds.
In the game series Bayonetta angels are enemies and all 3 spheres are present,  each divided in the same 3 orders as the traditional hierarchy.

See also
 Christian demonology
 De Coelesti Hierarchia
 Hierarchy of demons
 List of angels in theology
 Living creatures (Bible)
 Luminary (Gnosticism)

References